Ochsenheimeria algeriella is a moth of the family Ypsolophidae. It is found in Algeria.

References

Moths described in 1966
Ypsolophidae
Endemic fauna of Algeria
Moths of Africa